Haruaki (written: 治昭 or 治察) is a masculine Japanese given name. Notable people with the name include:

 (1758–1814), Japanese daimyō
 (1753–1774), Japanese samurai

Japanese masculine given names